Wolfgang Peters (born 3 July 1948 in Schwerte, North Rhine-Westphalia) is a former West German slalom canoeist who competed from the late 1960s to the mid-1970s. He won six medals at the ICF Canoe Slalom World Championships with three golds (C-1: 1967, 1969; C-1 team: 1969), a silver (C-1 team: 1971) and two bronzes (C-1 team: 1967, 1973).

Peters also finished fifth in the C-1 event at the 1972 Summer Olympics in Munich.

His daughter Violetta won a bronze medal in the women's K-1 event at the 2008 Summer Olympics in Beijing representing Austria. His brother Ulrich is also a former slalom canoeist.

References

External links
 

1948 births
Living people
People from Schwerte
Sportspeople from Arnsberg (region)
Canoeists at the 1972 Summer Olympics
German male canoeists
Olympic canoeists of West Germany
Medalists at the ICF Canoe Slalom World Championships